Mandy or Mandie may refer to:

People
 Mandy (name), a female given name and nickname
 Iván Mándy (1918-1995), Hungarian writer 
 Mark Mandy (born 1972), Irish retired high jumper
 Philip Mandie (born 1942), a former judge on the Supreme Court of Victoria, Australia

Books
 the title character of Handy Mandy in Oz (1937), in the "Oz Books" series by Frank Baum and his successors
 Mandy (comic), a British girls' comic published 1967–1991
 Mandie, a series of children's books written by Lois Gladys Leppard
 Mandy, a four-part children's book written by Julie Andrews, originally published in 1971 under the pen name Kim Edwards

Music
 Mandy (album), British singer Mandy Smith's 1988 debut album
 "Mandy" (Irving Berlin song), a 1919 song written by Irving Berlin
 "Brandy" (Scott English song), a 1971 song renamed to "Mandy" and made popular by Barry Manilow, and later a hit for Westlife
 "Mandy" (Jonas Brothers song), a 2005 song by the American boy band Jonas Brothers

TV and film
 Mandy (1952 film), a British drama about a deaf child
 Mandy (2018 film), an action/mystery film starring Nicolas Cage
 Mandy (TV series), British television series starring Diane Morgan

Other uses
 Mandy.com (Formerly known as Casting Call Pro), UK casting call and auditions website for cast, crew and creative professionals
 "Mandy", a street name for the drug MDMA, better known as ecstasy
 "Randy Mandy", nickname for the 2010 Red Bull RB6 Formula One racing car, given to it by driver, Sebastian Vettel

See also

 
 
 
 
 Milly-Molly-Mandy, a series of children's books by Joyce Lankester Brisley
 Mandi (disambiguation)